The Outcast is a 1993 fantasy novel by Simon Hawke, set in the world of Dark Sun, and based on the Dungeons & Dragons role-playing game. It is the first novel in the "Tribe of One" trilogy. It was published in paperback in November 1993.

Plot summary
Sorak is part elf and part halfling and has multiple personalities as a result of childhood trauma and is on a quest for a savior for the dying world of Athas.

Reception
A reviewer from Publishers Weekly comments that Hawke "more than intimates that Sorak himself is the long-awaited savior. His yarn offers fans of the fantasy genre some interesting themes to ponder."

Chris Wilson writing for Time describes The Outcast and The Tribe of One Trilogy as a fantasy epic that would have made for better TV than Game of Thrones.

Reviews
Review by Don D'Ammassa (1993) in Science Fiction Chronicle, #168 December 1993
Kliatt

References

1993 novels
Dark Sun novels
Novels by Simon Hawke